Deutsche Schule Madrid is a German international school in Madrid, Spain. It includes both the primary and secondary levels, ending with the Abitur.

The German international school in Madrid used to be located at Avenida Concha Espina 32 in 28016 Madrid. During the summer of 2015 the school moved to new premises at Monasterio de Guadalupe 7, 28049 , Fuencarral-El Pardo. It was the largest civil project of Germany located outside of German territory. The official opening in October 2015 was attended by Mayor of Madrid Manuela Carmena, the then German Minister of Foreign Affairs Frank-Walter Steinmeier, Spanish politician and DSM alumnus Íñigo Méndez de Vigo, and businesswoman Esther Alcocer.

References

External links

  Deutsche Schule in Madrid
  "Neubau Deutsche Schule Madrid" - Federal Office for Building and Regional Planning (BBR)
  "Deutsche Schule Madrid von Grüntuch Ernst eröffnet." BauNetz. 20 October 2015.
  Schuster, Anna-Maria. "Die Deutsche Schule in Madrid" (Archive). Madrider Zeitung. 15 September 2008.
  "El Colegio Alemán de Madrid inaugura su nueva sede en Montecarmelo" (Archive). Telemadrid. Retrieved on April 2, 2016.
  "El nuevo Colegio Alemán de Madrid." Colegio Oficial de Arquitectos de Madrid (ES). XII-SEMANA DE ARQUITECTURA 2015. 2 October 2015.

International schools in Madrid
Madrid
Private schools in Spain